Gadirtha inexacta is a moth of the family Nolidae first described by Francis Walker in 1858. It is found in northern India and Myanmar, as well as on Borneo. It has also been recorded from Queensland and New South Wales in Australia.

Adults are patchy brown, with two dark marks on the forewings. The hindwings are brown, darkening toward the margins.

The larvae feed on various Euphorbiaceae species, including Omalanthus populifolius, Sapium discolor and Triadica sebifera. They are white or green with long hairs. Pupation takes place in a papery cocoon covered with chewed leaf. The pupa is able to produce sounds when disturbed. This is achieved by rubbing projections on the abdominal skin against the inner surface of the cocoon.

References

Moths described in 1858
Eligminae